Sir Thomas Sutton Western, 2nd Baronet (7 October 1821 – 20 June 1877) was an English Liberal Party politician.

He was elected at the 1857 general election as Member of Parliament (MP) for Maldon in Essex. He was re-elected in 1859, but defeated at the 1865 general election. Western then stood in the Eastern division of Suffolk at the 1868 general election, but did not win a seat.

On 2 February 1848 he married Giulietta Romana, daughter of Sir Edward Manningham-Buller, 1st Baronet. There were no children and she died on 20 September 1850.

References

External links 
 

1821 births
1877 deaths
Liberal Party (UK) MPs for English constituencies
UK MPs 1857–1859
UK MPs 1859–1865
Baronets in the Baronetage of the United Kingdom
Members of Parliament for Maldon